A thumb signal, usually described as a thumbs-up or thumbs-down, is a common hand gesture achieved by a closed fist held with the thumb extended upward or downward in approval or disapproval, respectively.

History

Natural human behaviour
While the exact source of the thumb gesture is obscure, several origins have been proposed. Carleton S. Coon, having observed Barbary apes in Gibraltar using the gesture, hypothesised in the anthropological classic The Story of Man that it is a mutual celebration of having opposable thumbs. Critics have suggested, however, that the apes may be simply imitating humans.

Ancient Rome 

The Latin phrase pollice verso is used in the context of gladiatorial combat for a hand gesture used by Ancient Roman crowds to pass judgment on a defeated gladiator.

While it is clear that the thumb was involved, the precise type of gesture described by the phrase pollice verso and its meaning are unclear in the historical and literary record. According to Anthony Corbeill, a classical studies professor who has extensively researched the practice, thumbs up signalled killing the gladiator while "a closed fist with a wraparound thumb" meant sparing him. In modern popular culture, necessarily without a historical basis from Ancient Rome, it is wrongly presumed that "thumbs down" was the signal that a defeated gladiator should be condemned to death; "thumbs up", that he should be spared.

Middle Ages 
It has been suggested that 'thumbs up' was a signal from English archers preparing for battle that all is well with their bow and they are ready to fight. Before use, the fistmele (or the "brace height") was checked, that being the distance between the string and the bow on an English longbow. The term fistmele is a Saxon word that refers to that measurement.

Desmond Morris in Gestures: Their Origins and Distribution traces the practice back to a medieval custom used to seal business transactions. Over time, the mere sight of an upraised thumb came to symbolize harmony and kind feelings. For example in the seventeenth century, see the Diego Velázquez painting The Lunch.

20th century 

The Oxford English Dictionary cites the earliest written instance of "thumbs-up" (with a positive meaning) as being from Over the Top, a 1917 book written by Arthur Guy Empey. Empey was an American who served in the British armed forces during World War I. He wrote: "Thumbs up, Tommy’s expression which means ‘everything is fine with me'." A visual example of the British use of "thumbs up" having a positive meaning (or, "okay") from the 1920s can be seen 19 minutes into the British-made silent 1927 film The Lodger: A Story of the London Fog, where the younger man examines some paper money for the older man and declares it "good" (not counterfeit) with a "thumbs up" using both hands.

Popularization in the United States is generally attributed to the practices of World War II pilots, who used the thumbs up to communicate with ground crews before take-off. This custom may have originated with the China-based Flying Tigers, who were among the first American flyers involved in World War II. The appreciative Chinese would say ting hao de (挺好的) meaning "very good", and gesture with a thumbs up, which in Chinese means "you're number one". High officials in the Chinese government see it as a sign of respect.

During World War II, pilots on US aircraft carriers adopted the thumbs up gesture to alert the deck crew that they were ready to go and that the wheel chocks could be removed. On modern US carriers, specific deck crew hold a thumb up to signal to the pilot and control tower that their station is OK for take-off. American GIs are reputed to have picked up on the thumb gesture and spread it throughout Europe as they marched toward Berlin. According to Luís da Câmara Cascudo, Brazilians adopted the thumbs up from watching American pilots based in northern Brazil during World War II.

21st century 
Senator John McCain of Arizona, when he cast the deciding vote that derailed a Republican repeal of the Affordable Care Act ("Obamacare") on July 28, 2017, used the thumbs down gesture.

International usage 
The thumbs up signal has a generally positive connotation in English-speaking countries. However, its perceived meaning varies significantly from culture to culture.

The sign is said to have a pejorative meaning in some countries, including Iraq and Iran.

In Germany, France, Hungary and Finland the gesture can simply indicate the number one, in the right context.

The thumbs up gesture is used on the logo of Thums Up, a popular brand of cola from India. Starting in 2007, the thumbs-up also appeared on India's one-rupee coin.

In the United States, American Sign Language users use a single thumb up tilted slightly and rapidly left and right to indicate the number ten (10). When held stationary and thrust toward another person the meaning is "yourself". When lifted up by the other palm, the meaning is "help". The handshape is employed in the production of numerous signs in American Sign Language beyond those mentioned here.

On the Internet, and most particularly on the social media site Facebook, the thumbs up gesture is shown as an icon and is associated with the term "like"—which within that context means to follow or subscribe to the page, posts, or profile of another individual or company; and on YouTube, individual videos may be voted on positively or negatively by clicking the thumbs-up or thumbs-down icons respectively (which in some previous versions of the site, used to be accompanied by "Like" and "Dislike" labels, and are still referred as such nowadays), and in the case of a thumbs-up, the video gets added to the user's "Liked videos" playlist. See like button.

In underwater diving signals, thumb up means let's go up.

Context-specific usage 

More recently, these gestures are associated with film reviews, having been popularized by critics Gene Siskel and Roger Ebert on their televised review show Siskel & Ebert; the thumb up meaning a positive opinion of a film; the thumb down meaning a negative one. The trademarked phrase "two thumbs up", originally meaning a positive review from both reviewers, has come to be used as an indication of very high quality or unanimity of praise.

By extension from the film review usage, many websites (including Facebook) allow users to approve or disapprove of items, such as comments in a forum, products in a store, or even other people's reviews of movies, books, products, etc., by choosing to click either a thumbs-up or thumbs-down button. In the aggregate, this serves as an evaluation system. Other users may then see the total number of thumbs up and thumbs down given to an item or the number produced by subtracting thumbs down from thumbs up. In the latter case, an item that received exactly ten of each would read as having a rating of zero, rather than one of +10/-10. Often, users may view a list of items in order of popularity, as ranked by this metric.

Hitchhikers in the West traditionally use a thumb gesture to solicit rides from oncoming vehicles. However, in this presentation, the arm is generally outstretched with the palm and closed fingers facing the motorist. The gesture is usually performed with the hand nearest the motorist and points down the road, indicating the hopeful destination. A hitchhiker may wave the hand, emphasizing the directional meaning. This is similar to the "thumb towards the door" gesture, for "get out of here!"

In scuba diving, the thumbs-up gesture is a specific diving signal given underwater, in which the diver indicates that he or she is about to stop his or her dive and ascend. This occasionally confuses new divers, who might automatically gesture thumbs-up when trying to indicate approval—actually indicating a desire to stop diving and to ascend.  The diving signal for approval is the A-ok sign.

In basketball, when a held ball occurs, an official will jerk both thumbs in the air, signalling that a jump ball is in order.

In baseball, umpires will sometimes jerk a thumbs-up over their shoulder as an "out" signal

Amusement park rides such as roller coasters are usually cleared for departure using a thumbs-up signal from the workers after inspection that all safety precautions have been taken.

The Indian cola brand Thums Up, now owned by The Coca-Cola Company, is named after this symbol and uses it as its logo.

Texas A&M University uses a thumbs-up as their Gig 'em hand signal, as it represents the action of gigging. The gesture and corresponding slogan "Gig 'em, Aggies!" were popularized in the early 20th century, becoming the first hand sign of the Southwest Conference.

Unicode 
Unicode code points related to thumb signals include:

Other encodings 
Many keyboard emoticons utilize the shapes of lowercase "b" and "d" to represent a thumbs-up sign. Simple versions incorporate a dash for the wrist: -b (right hand) and d- (left hand). Many Japanese kaomoji icons place the thumbs beside a face constructed from punctuation marks, such as d(＾＾)ｂ or  b(~_^)d. Various instant messaging services use (y) and (n) as a shortcut for thumbs up and thumbs down emoji.

See also 

 OK (gesture)
 Finger (gesture)

References 

Hand gestures
Fingers